Calmagite is a complexometric indicator used in analytical chemistry to identify the presence of metal ions in solution. As with other metal ion indicators calmagite will change color when it is bound to an ion. Calmagite will be wine red when it is bound to a metal ion and may be blue, red, or orange when it is not bound to a metal ion. Calmagite is often used in conjunction with EDTA, a stronger metal binding agent. This chemical is also used in the quantitation of magnesium in the clinical laboratory.

References

Complexometric indicators
Azo compounds
2-Naphthols
Naphthalenesulfonic acids